Midzhur Peak is the peak rising to 1627 m in Doyran Heights, southeast Sentinel Range in Ellsworth Mountains, Antarctica, and surmounting Remington Glacier to the north and Obelya Glacier to the south.

The peak is named after Midzhur Peak in western Balkan Mountains.

Location
US mapping in 1961, updated in 1988.

See also
 Mountains in Antarctica

Maps
 Vinson Massif.  Scale 1:250 000 topographic map.  Reston, Virginia: US Geological Survey, 1988.
 Antarctic Digital Database (ADD). Scale 1:250000 topographic map of Antarctica. Scientific Committee on Antarctic Research (SCAR). Since 1993, regularly updated.

Notes

External links
 Midzhur Peak. SCAR Composite Antarctic Gazetteer
 Bulgarian Antarctic Gazetteer Antarctic Place-names Commission (in Bulgarian)
 Basic data (in English)
 Midzhur Peak. Adjusted Copernix satellite image

Bulgaria and the Antarctic
Ellsworth Mountains
Mountains of Ellsworth Land